Black Velvet is the fourth and final studio album by American funk/soul artist Charles Bradley, released on 9 November 2018. The album release was preceded by two singles, "Can't Fight the Feeling" and "I Feel a Change". The name of the album comes from Bradley's stage name during his time as a James Brown impersonator. The album consists of songs originally recorded for Bradley's three previous studio albums, and was compiled by producer Thomas Brenneck after Bradley's death from cancer in September 2017. Included are covers of "Stay Away" by Nirvana and "Heart of Gold" by Neil Young.

Track listing

Personnel
 Charles Bradley – vocals

Menahan Street Band

 Victor Axelrod – piano/vibraphone
 Thomas Brenneck – guitar/bass guitar/organ/percussion
 Nick Movshon – bass guitar
 Homer Steinweiss – drums
 Michael Deller – organ
 David Guy – trumpet
 Leon Michels – saxophone/organ/flute

Charts

References

2018 albums
Albums published posthumously
Charles Bradley (singer) albums
Daptone Records albums